Cook's Harbour is a town in the Canadian province of Newfoundland and Labrador. The town had a population of 123 in the Canada 2016 Census. The population as of 2021 was 118 (including Wild Bight and Boat Harbour) but the population has been decreasing ever since then.

The school in Cook's Harbour is called James Cook Memorial there are 5 students in the school as of 2023.

History
Cook's Harbour was named by Captain James Cook in 1764, during his survey of Newfoundland.

Demographics 

References 

Towns in Newfoundland and Labrador